Herrania umbratica is a species of flowering plant in the family Malvaceae (as currently recognized).
It is found only in Colombia.

References

umbratia
Endemic flora of Colombia
Taxonomy articles created by Polbot

Critically endangered flora of South America